Proprioscypha is a genus of fungi within the Hyaloscyphaceae family.

References

External links 

 Proprioscypha at Index Fungorum

Hyaloscyphaceae